2015 Shonan Bellmare season.

J1 League

References

External links
 J.League official site

Shonan Bellmare
Shonan Bellmare seasons